KCEZ is a commercial radio station licensed to Los Molinos, California, broadcasting to the Butte and Tehama County areas on 102.1 FM.  KCEZ airs CHR/Rhythmic Contemporary music format branded as "Power 102".

Format History
1998-2011 Oldies
2011- CHR/Rhythmic Contemporary

External links
Power 102 website

CEZ
Rhythmic contemporary radio stations in the United States
Contemporary hit radio stations in the United States
Radio stations established in 1998